Achit may refer to:
Acharya Institute of Technology (ACHIT), a private co-educational engineering and management college in Bangalore, India
Achit Lake, a lake in Mongolia
Achit (urban-type settlement), an urban locality (a work settlement) in Sverdlovsk Oblast, Russia
Achit (metaphysics), a term used in Vishishtadvaita to refer to the world of insentient entities as denoted by matter

Achit may refer to:
maharashtrian indian boy name  (ACHIT),achit means unbeatable 
Achitkhot, 
Achit (achit khot instrumentation engineer ),  (a work settlement) [[administrative divisions of mspgcl